Procambarus fitzpatricki, sometimes called the spinytail crayfish, is a species of crayfish in the family Cambaridae. It is endemic to southern Mississippi, between the Wolf River and the Pascagoula River, and is listed as a species of Least Concern on the IUCN Red List. It is the only species in the subgenus Procambarus (Acucauda).

References

Cambaridae
Endemic fauna of Mississippi
Freshwater crustaceans of North America
Taxonomy articles created by Polbot
Crustaceans described in 1971
Taxa named by Horton H. Hobbs Jr.